Carricknath Point to Porthbean Beach (meaning hewn rock and , meaning small cove) is a coastal Site of Special Scientific Interest (SSSI) in Cornwall, England, UK, noted for its biological interest.

Geography
The first is from Carricknath Point to St Anthony Head, at the southern tip of the civil parish, the second is from Porthbeor Beach to Portscatho and the third is at Porthbean Beach, to the northern end of the parish.

The South West Coast Path runs through the SSSI and part of the coastline around St Anthony Head is owned by the National Trust. The shoreline below this section is part of the Lower Fal & Helford Intertidal SSSI, the cliffs being designated as within this SSSI.

Wildlife and ecology
The habitat of the first, southernmost, section consists of cliffs overhanging damp rock ledges in which the internationally rare and threatened Shore Dock (Rumex rupestris) can be found, amongst other flora.

The second stretch of coastline contains a variety of different coastal habitats, including sand covered beaches, natural rock platforms with fragments of saltmarsh, cliff top grassland and low rocky headlands. Here the nationally scarce species of Babington's Leek (Allium ampeloprasum) and Hairy Bird's-foot Trefoil (Lotus subbiflorus) grows, and a variety of invertebrates can be found.

The third, northernmost section, at Porthbean Beach the nationally declining species of Sea Kale (Crambe maritima) occurs.

References

Sites of Special Scientific Interest in Cornwall
Sites of Special Scientific Interest notified in 2000
Cornish coast